Striježevica is a village in Požega-Slavonia County, Croatia. The village is administered as a part of the Brestovac municipality.
According to national census of 2001, population of the village is 7. The village is connected by the D69 state road.

Sources

Populated places in Požega-Slavonia County